Harry Rodney Green (24 June 1939 – 21 November 2018), known as Rodney Green, was an English footballer, born in Halifax, West Yorkshire, who played in the Football League as a centre forward for Halifax Town, Bradford (Park Avenue), Bradford City, Gillingham, Grimsby Town, Charlton Athletic, Luton Town and Watford.

Green started his career with his hometown club Halifax Town before playing for the two Bradford league sides, first Bradford (Park Avenue) then Bradford City. In his second full season, 1963–64, he was City's top goal-scorer, with 29 league goals and two League Cup goals including two hat-tricks.

He left City with 39 league goals from 66 games, to join Gillingham where his 17 goals came in 33 games, then Grimsby Town, scoring 20 league goals in 65 games. His career continued at Charlton Athletic, Luton Town and Watford before he moved to South Africa.

Green played for Durban United in South Africa before returning to Halifax to run an antiques shop and a furniture import business.

References

1939 births
2018 deaths
Footballers from Halifax, West Yorkshire
English footballers
Association football forwards
Halifax Town A.F.C. players
Bradford (Park Avenue) A.F.C. players
Bradford City A.F.C. players
Gillingham F.C. players
Grimsby Town F.C. players
Charlton Athletic F.C. players
Luton Town F.C. players
Watford F.C. players
English Football League players
Durban United F.C. players